Army of the Pharaohs (most commonly abbreviated as AOTP or A.O.T.P.) is a hip hop supergroup originating from Philadelphia, Pennsylvania, formed by Jedi Mind Tricks MC Vinnie Paz in 1998. The group has strong links to other underground groups such as; OuterSpace, Demigodz, Snowgoons, La Coka Nostra, JuJu Mob, Official Pistol Gang, and Jedi Mind Tricks. It has changed several times ever since its formation.

Members

Original Formation 
 Vinnie Paz (1998–present)
 Bahamadia (1998–1999)
 Chief Kamachi (1998–2007)
 Virtuoso (1998–2003)
 Esoteric (1998–present)
 7L (1998–2006)
 Stoupe the Enemy of Mankind  (1998–1999)

Resurrection 
 Crypt the Warchild (2001–present)
 Planetary (2001–present)
 Celph Titled (2001–present)
 Reef the Lost Cauze (2001–present)
 King Syze (2001–present)
 Des Devious (2001–2015)
 Apathy (2001–present)

More additions and returns 
 Faez One (2001–2006)
 Doap Nixon (2006–2020)
 Demoz (2006–present)
 King Magnetic (2006–2020)
 Jus Allah (2007–2010)
 Journalist (2009–2010)

Even more additions 
 Block McCloud (2010–present)
 Blacastan (2011–present)
 Zilla (2011–present)
 Lawrence Arnell (2013-present)

Timeline

See also 
 Army of the Pharaohs

References 

 
Army of the Pharaohs